Noordhinder Bank is a shoal in the southern part of the North Sea,  between Antwerp, Belgium, and the mouth of the Thames in south-east England.

There is, or was, a lightship there.

During World War I, there was a naval skirmish referred to as the Battle off Noordhinder Bank between the German and British naval forces nearby.

Coordinate location 
Noordhinder Bank is at

References

Sandbanks of the North Sea
Landforms of England
Landforms of Belgium
Shoals of the Netherlands
Shoals of the United Kingdom